Thermoniphas colorata is a butterfly in the family Lycaenidae. It is found along the coast of Kenya and in Ethiopia, eastern Tanzania, Malawi, Zambia, Mozambique and north-western Zimbabwe. The habitat consists of marshy areas in and on the edges of forests.

Both sexes are attracted to flowers.

The larvae feed on Calvoa orientalis and Dissotis species.

References

Butterflies described in 1932
Thermoniphas